Kyamdi is a village located near Jalaun in the State of Uttar Pradesh in India.

References

Villages in Jalaun district